Clemilda Fernandes Silva (born June 25, 1979) is a Brazilian cycle racer, who is currently suspended from the sport.

Career
Born in São Félix do Araguaia, Mato Grosso, Fernandes scored three consecutive wins in the Copa América de Ciclismo in 2005, 2006 and 2007. She competed in the Women's road race at the 2008 Summer Olympics, finishing in 51st place.  At the 2012 Summer Olympics in the Women's road race, finishing 23rd, and in the Women's time trial, finishing 18th.
She competed at the 2016 Olympic Games in Rio de Janeiro.

In 2019, Fernandes was given an eight-year ban for an anti-doping violation, specific to tampering.

Major results

2003
 1st Copa da Republica de Ciclismo
 2nd Copa América de Ciclismo
2004
 1st Stage 3 Trophée d'Or Féminin
2005
 1st  Road race, National Road Championships
 1st Copa América de Ciclismo
 1st Stage 3b Giro della Toscana Int. Femminile – Memorial Michela Fanini
 3rd GP Città di Castenaso
2006
 1st Copa América de Ciclismo
 1st Stage 5 Tour Cycliste Féminin International de l'Ardèche
 3rd  Road race, Pan American Road Championships
 3rd Road race, National Road Championships
 6th Overall Giro della Toscana Int. Femminile – Memorial Michela Fanini
2007
 1st Copa América de Ciclismo
 1st Giro del Valdarno
 3rd  Time trial, Pan American Games
 4th Overall Tour Cycliste Féminin International de l'Ardèche
 6th Road race, Pan American Road Championships
 7th Overall Vuelta Ciclista Femenina a El Salvador
2008
 1st  Road race, National Road Championships
 3rd Copa América de Ciclismo
 10th Road race, Pan American Road Championships
2009
 2nd Road race, National Road Championships
2012
 1st Overall Vuelta Ciclista Femenina a El Salvador
1st Stage 3a
 2nd Clasicó Fundadeporte
 Pan American Road Championships
3rd  Time trial
6th Road race
 4th Grand Prix el Salvador
 10th Clásico Aniversario Federacion Ciclista de Venezuela
2013
 National Road Championships
1st  Time trial
2nd Road race
 1st Grand Prix GSB
 3rd Grand Prix de Oriente
 4th Overall Vuelta Ciclista Femenina a El Salvador
1st Stages 3 & 7
 4th Grand Prix el Salvador
2014
 2nd Time trial, National Road Championships
 3rd  Time trial, South American Games
 3rd Overall Tour Femenino de San Luis
1st Stage 2
 4th Time trial, Pan American Road Championships
2015
 Military World Games
1st  Team road race
2nd  Road race
 1st  Road race, National Road Championships
 Pan American Road Championships
3rd  Time trial
8th Road race
 3rd Gran Prix San Luis Femenino
 9th Time trial, Pan American Games
2016
 National Road Championships
1st  Time trial
1st  Road race
 7th Time trial, Pan American Road Championships
 7th Copa Federación Venezolana de Ciclismo
 8th Clasico FVCiclismo Corre Por la VIDA
2017
 1st  Team pursuit, National Track Championships
 2nd Time trial, National Road Championships
2018
 9th Time trial, Pan American Road Championships
2019
 2nd Overall Tour Femenino de Venezuela II
 2nd Tour Femenino de Venezuela I

References

External links

1979 births
Living people
Brazilian female cyclists
Brazilian road racing cyclists
Cyclists at the 2007 Pan American Games
Cyclists at the 2008 Summer Olympics
Cyclists at the 2011 Pan American Games
Olympic cyclists of Brazil
Sportspeople from Mato Grosso
Cyclists at the 2012 Summer Olympics
Cyclists at the 2015 Pan American Games
Cyclists at the 2016 Summer Olympics
Pan American Games bronze medalists for Brazil
Pan American Games medalists in cycling
South American Games bronze medalists for Brazil
South American Games medalists in cycling
Competitors at the 2014 South American Games
Medalists at the 2007 Pan American Games